No. 1406 (Meteorological) Flight RAF was formed at RAF Wick on 9 May 1941, equipped with a variety of aircraft, including Handley Page Hampdens and Supermarine Spitfires. 1406 Flight disbanded on 7 August 1943 forming the basis of 519 Squadron. The flight performed a range of meteorological reconnaissance duties over the North Sea.

See also
List of Royal Air Force aircraft squadrons
List of RAF Regiment units
List of Fleet Air Arm aircraft squadrons
List of Army Air Corps aircraft units
List of Royal Air Force aircraft independent flights
List of RAF Squadron Codes

Notes

References

1406
Military weather units and formations
Military units and formations established in 1943